Menoua is a department of West Province in Cameroon. The department covers an area of 1,380 km and as of 2019 had a total population of 276,000. The capital of the department lies at Dschang.

Subdivisions
The department is divided administratively into 7 communes and in turn into villages.

Communes 
 Dschang (urban)
 Dschang (rural)
 Fokoué
 Fongo-Tongo
 Nkong-Zem
 Penka-Michel

References

Departments of Cameroon
West Region (Cameroon)